William Harvey Austin (October 22, 1859 – October 15, 1922) was an American politician and lawyer.

Born in Binghamton, New York, Austin moved to Portage, Wisconsin in 1869 and then permanently settled in Milwaukee, Wisconsin in 1871. He went to the Milwaukee public schools. Austin studied law and was admitted to the Wisconsin bar in 1879. He served as counsel for the Wisconsin Brewers' Association and the United States Brewers' Association. Austin served as assistant district attorney for Milwaukee County, Wisconsin and as school commissioner. He also served as assistant city attorney and city attorney for the City of Milwaukee. In 1893, Austin served in the Wisconsin State Assembly and was a Republican. Then from 1895 to 1899, Austin served in the Wisconsin State Senate. Austin died at his home in Milwaukee, Wisconsin from stomach trouble.

Notes

1859 births
1922 deaths
Politicians from Binghamton, New York
Politicians from Milwaukee
Wisconsin lawyers
Republican Party members of the Wisconsin State Assembly
Republican Party Wisconsin state senators
Lawyers from Binghamton, New York
19th-century American lawyers